The English cricket team in Australia in 1901–02 lost the Test series to Australia, who came from one down to win 4–1 and thus retained The Ashes. The England side was a private venture of Archie MacLaren at the invitation of the Melbourne Cricket Club, after MCC had declined to send a team. Prior to this, all Test tours of Australia had been privately organised, but MCC took over the responsibility with the following tour in 1903–4. George Hirst, Wilfred Rhodes, KS Ranjitsinjhi, Stanley Jackson and CB Fry were all unavailable.

Only three centuries were scored in the series and only one team innings exceeded 400 (the first innings of England in the first Test). Clem Hill managed 521 runs at an average of 52.10, making successive scores of 99, 98 and 97, without scoring a century. England's most successful batsman was MacLaren, with 412 runs at 45.77.

Sydney Barnes made his debut for England and took 19 wickets in the first two Tests before being injured in the third and taking no further part in the series. His selection for the tour was something of a coup for MacLaren, as Barnes had very little first-class experience behind him: a total of seven games. He had been playing in the Lancashire League during the 1901 English season, but appeared in one game for Lancashire near the end of the season, taking 6/70 and 0/29. As a result of this performance MacLaren, who was the Lancashire captain, selected him for the touring party.

For Australia, Monty Noble and Hugh Trumble took 60 wickets between them.

Test series summary
Match length: Timeless. Balls per over: 6.

Australia won the Test series 4–1.

First Test

Second Test

Third Test

Fourth Test

Fifth Test

References

External links
 Wisden Cricketers' Almanack, 1903 edition, "England in Australia 1901-02"

1901 in Australian cricket
1901 in English cricket
1902 in Australian cricket
1902 in English cricket
Australian cricket seasons from 1890–91 to 1917–18
1901-02
International cricket competitions from 1888–89 to 1918
1901-02